Tina Wang (born 13 December 1991) is a Chinese-Australian former competitive figure skater. She became the Australian national champion in the 2008–09 season and qualified to the free skate at two Four Continents Championships.

Personal life 
Tina Wang was born in Qiqihar to Chang Yuan "Andrew" Wang and Hui "Helen" Ma, who were both national team coaches in China before the family moved to Australia. They settled in Sunnybank Hills. She is the cousin of Chinese ice dancer Zhang Weina. She is the aunty of three kids. Mia Zeng, Mike Zeng and Michelle Zeng. Those kids are Weina's children.

Career 
Wang was coached by her parents in Brisbane. Her junior international debut came in October 2005 at a Junior Grand Prix event in Japan. She won the Australian national junior title and went on to compete at the 2006 World Junior Championships in Ljubljana, Slovenia, finishing 26th.

During the next two seasons, Wang won silver on the senior level at the Australian Championships. Her first senior international competition was the 2008 Four Continents Championships in Goyang, South Korea. Ranked 21st in the short program, she advanced to the free skate and finished 19th overall.

In the 2008–09 season, Wang became the Australian national senior champion. She finished 18th at the 2009 Four Continents Championships in Vancouver, British Columbia, Canada, after placing 18th in the short and 17th in the free skate.

Programs

Competitive highlights 
JGP: Junior Grand Prix

References

External links
 

Australian female single skaters
Chinese emigrants to Australia
1991 births
Living people
Sportswomen from Queensland
Sportspeople from Qiqihar
Sportspeople from Brisbane